The 1911–12 season was the 39th season of competitive football in Scotland and the 22nd season of the Scottish Football League.

Scottish League Division One

Champions: Rangers

Scottish League Division Two

Scottish Cup

Celtic were winners of the Scottish Cup after a 2–0 win over Clyde in the final. Joe Watters scored the two game-winning goals in the last 23 seconds of the game.

Other honours

National

County

. *replay

Highland League

Junior Cup

Petershill were winners of the Junior Cup after a 5–0 win over Denny Hibs in the final.

Scotland national team

Scotland shared the 1912 British Home Championship trophy with England.

Key:
 (H) = Home match
 (A) = Away match
 BHC = British Home Championship

See also
1911–12 Aberdeen F.C. season

Notes and references

External links
Scottish Football Historical Archive

 
Seasons in Scottish football